Daniel Márcio Fernandes (born 25 September 1983) is a professional footballer who plays for Maltese club Gudja United F.C. as a goalkeeper.

He moved frequently in his club career, representing teams in Portugal, Spain, Germany, Greece, Romania, the Netherlands, the United States, Norway and Malta.

Internationally, Fernandes played for Canada at under-20 level before switching allegiance to Portugal, and was called up for their senior team at the 2010 World Cup.

Early life
The son of a Portuguese father and a Czechoslovakian mother, Fernandes was born in Edmonton, Alberta, being raised in East Vancouver, British Columbia. His first club was the Vancouver Olympics.

Club career

Early days
In 2000, aged 17, Fernandes returned to the land of his father and joined FC Porto's youth system. In his first two years as a senior he only managed to appear for the reserves, his second team being Celta de Vigo B in Spain.

In January 2003, the Galicians loaned Fernandes to 2. Bundesliga side SSV Jahn Regensburg, but again failed to appear officially for the main squad, returning in June to Celta and being released from contract.

PAOK
After a successful trial, Fernandes signed with PAOK FC, totalling four Super League Greece games in his first two seasons. In 2005, the team's general manager – and former player – Giorgos Kostikos took over after coach Nikos Karageorgiou was dismissed following a bad string of results. He immediately replaced ageing Kyriakos Tohouroglou in his starting XI with the Portuguese.

Despite many problems both inside and outside the pitch, PAOK managed to finish in sixth place in the 2005–06 campaign, with Fernandes making 27 appearances as the Thessaloniki club qualified for the UEFA Cup, only to be disqualified shortly after for irregularities. He remained first choice for the remainder of his spell.

VfL Bochum
On 23 May 2008, after extensive negotiations, PAOK accepted an offer from VfL Bochum, who signed Fernandes for a fee of approximately €1.2 million, with the player reuniting at the German side with former teammate Marcin Mięciel.

Fernandes made his Bundesliga debut on 16 August 2008, in a 1–0 away loss against Karlsruher SC. He only missed three league matches in his first season, as the North Rhine-Westphalia team retained their top-division status after finishing 14th.

In 2009–10, Fernandes was relegated to the bench by Philipp Heerwagen and, on 18 January 2010, he was loaned to Iraklis Thessaloniki F.C. until the end of the campaign. In the summer, he signed on loan with another Greek side, Panathinaikos FC, who retained an option to buy.

Fernandes moved to Panserraikos F.C. in January 2011, again on loan. He appeared sparingly as the team were relegated from the top tier, and was released by Bochum in June.

Cluj and Twente
On 16 August 2011, Fernandes joined Romania's CFR Cluj. He was released after five months, in which he played just two games.

Fernandes moved teams and countries again on 17 January 2012, signing a two-year contract with FC Twente in the Eredivisie and competing with Nikolay Mihaylov for the no.1 position. He spent the following seasons on loan, with OFI Crete FC and Panthrakikos FC.

North America
On 3 August 2015, Fernandes moved to the San Antonio Scorpions on loan from Twente. After the former ceased operations following the 2015 NASL season, he joined manager Alen Marcina as both signed with Rayo OKC on 2 February 2016.

Return to Europe
For the second consecutive time, Fernandes' American club folded, and he signed for Norwegian Eliteserien team Lillestrøm SK on a one-year deal in January 2017. In May he failed a doping test when he tested positive for dextroamphetamine, and was frozen out of the squad while his representatives appealed on the basis that the drug was prescribed medicine for his attention deficit hyperactivity disorder and worthy of a medical exemption.

On 1 July 2018, the 34-year-old Fernandes returned to Portuguese club football for the first time in 16 years, joining S.C. Farense for their upcoming season back in LigaPro. He made his debut for the Algarveans – his first professional appearance in the country – on 11 August, in a 1–0 home win over F.C. Famalicão.

Fernandes' side achieved promotion to the Primeira Liga at the end of the following campaign, but he played no league matches in the process. In August 2020, he signed a one-year contract with Tarxien Rainbows F.C. of the Maltese Premier League. At its conclusion, he joined Birkirkara F.C. in the same league.

International career
Fernandes won caps for Canada at under-20 level. He then changed to play for the country of his father, Portugal, and made his under-21 debut in 2006.

Fernandes received his first senior call-up in November 2006, as third goalkeeper behind Ricardo and Quim. In May of the following year, he was selected for a UEFA Euro 2008 qualifier against Belgium and a friendly with Kuwait, making his debut in the latter after replacing Quim in the 66th minute of a 1–1 draw.

On 11 February 2009, Fernandes played his second international match, substituting Eduardo at the hour-mark of a 1–0 win against Finland. In May 2010 he was named in the 23-man squad for that year's FIFA World Cup, but did not appear in the tournament held in South Africa.

Career statistics

Club

International

Honours
CFR Cluj
Liga I: 2011–12

Individual
PAOK MVP of the Season: 2007–08

References

External links

1983 births
Living people
Canadian people of Czech descent
Canadian people of Portuguese descent
Portuguese people of Czech descent
Canadian soccer players
Portuguese footballers
Soccer players from Edmonton
Association football goalkeepers
Liga Portugal 2 players
FC Porto B players
S.C. Farense players
Celta de Vigo B players
Bundesliga players
SSV Jahn Regensburg players
VfL Bochum players
Super League Greece players
PAOK FC players
Iraklis Thessaloniki F.C. players
Panathinaikos F.C. players
Panserraikos F.C. players
OFI Crete F.C. players
Panthrakikos F.C. players
Liga I players
CFR Cluj players
FC Twente players
North American Soccer League players
San Antonio Scorpions players
Rayo OKC players
Eliteserien players
Lillestrøm SK players
Maltese Premier League players
Tarxien Rainbows F.C. players
Birkirkara F.C. players
Gudja United F.C. players
Portugal under-21 international footballers
Portugal international footballers
2010 FIFA World Cup players
Canadian expatriate soccer players
Portuguese expatriate footballers
Expatriate footballers in Spain
Expatriate footballers in Germany
Expatriate footballers in Greece
Expatriate footballers in Romania
Expatriate footballers in the Netherlands
Expatriate soccer players in the United States
Expatriate footballers in Norway
Expatriate footballers in Malta
Portuguese expatriate sportspeople in Spain
Portuguese expatriate sportspeople in Germany
Portuguese expatriate sportspeople in Greece
Portuguese expatriate sportspeople in Romania
Portuguese expatriate sportspeople in the Netherlands
Portuguese expatriate sportspeople in the United States
Portuguese expatriate sportspeople in Norway
Doping cases in association football
Portuguese sportspeople in doping cases